Yuanjisi Reservoir, or Yuanji Temple Reservoir, also known as Moon Lake, is a middle-sized reservoir in Huangpi District, Wuhan City, Hubei Province, China, located in the upper reaches of Bomogang River, a tributary of Sheshui River.

The reservoir has a water surface area of 533.3 hectares with a total storage capacity of 104.8 million cubic meters.

History
The construction of Yuanjisi Reservoir started in October 1958, employing more than 20,000 people in Huangpi County at the time, and was completed in January 1961.

References

Reservoirs in China
Buildings and structures in Hubei
Buildings and structures completed in 1961